Songs & Crazy Dreams is a 1992 compilation album by Irish singer/songwriter Paul Brady. Released in 1992, it features re-mixed versions of songs from the previous decade.

Track listing
Crazy Dreams  
Paradise Is Here
Dancer In The Fire
Nothing But The Same Old Story
Deep In Your Heart  
The Homes Of Donegal
Walk The White Line
The Road To The Promised Land
The Island
Steal Your Heart Away
Follow On
Helpless Heart

External links
Songs & Crazy Dreams on Official Paul Brady Store
Songs & Crazy Dreams on  Amazon

Paul Brady albums
1995 compilation albums